Messier 41 (also known as M41 or NGC 2287) is an open cluster in the constellation Canis Major, sometimes referred to as The Little Beehive Cluster. It was discovered by Giovanni Batista Hodierna before 1654 and was perhaps known to Aristotle about 325 BC. It lies about four degrees almost exactly south of Sirius, with which it forms a roughly equilateral triangle with Nu2 Canis Majoris to the west—all three figure in the same field in binoculars.

The cluster covers an area about the size of the full Moon. It contains about 100 stars, including several red giants the brightest of which has  spectral type K3, apparent magnitude 6.3 and is near the center, and some white dwarfs. The cluster is estimated to be moving away from us at 23.3 km/s. It is estimated to be 190 million years old, and cluster properties and dynamics suggest a total life expectancy of 500 million years for this cluster, before it will have disintegrated.

Walter Scott Houston describes the appearance of the cluster in small telescopes:

Many visual observers speak of seeing curved lines of stars in M41.  Although they seem inconspicuous on photographs, the curves stand out strongly in my 10-inch [reflecting telescope], and the bright red star near the center of the cluster is prominent.

The bright red/orange star near the center is HIP 32406, a giant star of spectral type K2, about 1500 ly away of magnitude 6.9.

Gallery

See also
 List of Messier objects
 New General Catalogue
 Messier object
 List of open clusters

References

External links

 Messier 41, SEDS Messier pages
 NightSkyInfo.com – M41
 M41 Hires LRGB CCD Image

Messier 041
Messier 041
041
Messier 041
Orion–Cygnus Arm
Astronomical objects known since antiquity